Shahina E. K. (born 29 June 1978)  is an Indian contemporary short story writer from Kerala. She is one of the notable writers in  Malayalam literature. She was born in Perinthalmanna, Malappuram district in Kerala. Her stories speak about the common people and the issues related with them. The author’s way of writing is very sharp and powerful.

Translation, novelette, children's literature, poetry etc are her other interested genres and published an anthology of poems, novelette, novel for children etc. Her book, Puthumazha choorulla chumbanangal won Edasseri Award in 2015.

Bibliography

Collections of short stories
 Phantom Bath
 Anandapadmanabhante marakkuthirakal - (Malayalam:അനന്തപദ്മന്ഭാന്റെ മരക്കുതിരകൾ)
 Puthumazha choorulla chumbanangal - (Malayalam:പുതുമഴ ചൂരുള്ള ചുംബനങ്ങൾ)
 Pranayathinte Theekkadinumappuram 
 Neelatheevandi - (Malayalam:നീലത്തീവണ്ടി)
 Unni Express Delheennu Mutthashi veettileykk - (Malayalam:ഉണ്ണി എക്സ്പ്രസ്സ് ഡെൽഹീന്ന് മുത്തശ്ശി വീട്ടിലേക്ക് - children's literature _novel)

Translation works
 The prophet to (Malayalam:പ്രവാചകൻ)

Poems
 Ottanjodi kavithakal to (Malayalam: ഒറ്റഞൊടി കവിതകൾ)

References

External links 
 
 
 
 
 

21st-century Indian short story writers
Indian women short story writers
1978 births
Living people
21st-century Indian women writers
Malayalam short story writers
People from Malappuram district
Writers from Kerala
Women writers from Kerala